Lahav (lit. blade) is a kibbutz in southern Israel. Located around 20 km north of Beersheba and covering 33,000 dunams, it falls under the jurisdiction of Bnei Shimon Regional Council.

History
The kibbutz was established in 1952 and was initially named Tziklag after the Biblical city of Ziklag, which was thought to have been located nearby. Originally the founders had been unsure whether to settle in the Negev or Galilee, but accepted a government decision that settling on Tel Halif (Tell el-Khuweilifeh) in the Negev was more important. After a few years, the kibbutz was renamed Lahav in honour of the Nahal group which established it.

Archaeology 
The ancient settlement of Tel Halif flourished at the time of ancient Egypt. It was a 7-acre site, and it was occupied from Chalcolithic times. Also, significant Early Bronze Age remains have been found. During the Late Bronze period, an Egyptian “residence building” had been discovered. This was the period corresponding to the New Kingdom of Egypt, with several other similar sites found in this area.

Significant discoveries were made during the excavations in 1994 at the 'Silo site' in the Nahal Tillah area. Protodynastic and Early Dynastic Egyptian buildings remains and pottery vessels were found. Also, a clay seal impression was found, as well as a sherd bearing the serekh symbol of King Narmer.

The settlement continued to flourish during the Iron Age II period, when it was fortified. It was also active during the Persian period; many figurine fragments have been discovered from that time.

Economy
The economy of Kibbutz Lahav is based on agriculture (both crops and livestock) and two industrial ventures: a plant for plastic containers (Dolav) owned and operated jointly with the neighboring kibbutz, Dvir, and a meat processing plant.

In 1963, Lahav established the Institute for Animal Research with guidance from leading scientists from the Hebrew University's Faculty of Agriculture, which is the only research facility in Israel specializing in raising pigs. According to a 1963 law, pigs can be legally raised in kibbutzim (or more generally on land leased from the state) only for research purposes, but meat from surplus animals may be sold. While all other kibbutzim abandoned pig farming to comply with the 1963 law, Lahav transferred its pig farm to its new organization, the Institute for Animal Research, which continues to supply Lahav's meat processing factory with surplus pigs. Lahav's pork and other meat products are nationally marketed in non-kosher food stores all over Israel, and the Lahav brand is a major competitor to non-kosher meat products of Mizra.

The production of pig meat has raised criticism since the Torah prohibits the consumption of pork, which goes against the prevailing narrative of Israel as a "Jewish state".

References

External links
Lahav Negev Information Centre
Lahav Bnei Shimon Regional Council 

Kibbutzim
Kibbutz Movement
Populated places established in 1952
Populated places in Southern District (Israel)
1952 establishments in Israel